Kim Liên is a large village and commune in the Nam Đàn District of Nghệ An Province in Vietnam. Kim Lien is the childhood home of former president Ho Chi Minh and his parents' house there is the site of the Kim Liên museum. The village is also called  Làng Sen.

History
The name of the village means "Gold-Lilly", and the district "South-Sandalwood" in Sino-Vietnamese characters (南檀, 金莲).

References

Communes of Nghệ An province
Populated places in Nghệ An province